DG TREN of the  European Commission is now part of
 Directorate-General for Mobility and Transport (European Commission)
 Directorate-General for Energy (European Commission)